Calthalotia strigata is a species of sea snail, a marine gastropod mollusk in the family Trochidae, the top snails.

Description
The size of the adult shell varies between 10 mm and 23 mm. The subperforate shell has an elevated-conical shape.  It is painted with longitudinal stripes of white and red or green or with longitudinal purplish flammules.  The plane whorls are concave in the middle. They show at the sutures a prominent rounded ridge, transversely lirate. The lirae are equal and subgranulose. The base of the shell is concentrically lirate, with radiating striae in the interstices. The aperture is subquadrate. The lip is arcuate, ending anteriorly in an obtuse tooth. The lip is obsoletely sulcate within.

Distribution
This marine species is endemic to Australia and occurs off Western Australia.

References

 Adams, A. & Angas, G.F. 1864. Descriptions of new species of shells, chiefly from Australia in the collection of Mr Angas. Proceedings of the Zoological Society of London 1864: 35–40 
 Hedley, C. 1908. Studies on Australian Mollusca. Part 10. Proceedings of the Linnean Society of New South Wales 33: 456–489
 Hickman, C.S. & McLean, J.H. 1990. Systematic revision and suprageneric classification of trochacean gastropods. Natural History Museum of Los Angeles County. Science Series 35: i–vi, 1–169
 Wilson B. (1993) Australian marine shells. Prosobranch gastropods. Vol. 1. Odyssey Publishing, Kallaroo, Western Australia, 408 pp

External links
 Adams, A. 1853. Contributions towards a monograph of the Trochidae, a family of gastropodous Mollusca. Proceedings of the Zoological Society of London 1851(19): 150–192
 

strigata
Gastropods of Australia
Gastropods described in 1853